CIRB was a radio station which operated on the frequency of 1240 kHz/AM in Lac-Etchemin, Quebec, Canada. The station was owned by Radio Beauce Inc., and broadcast at a power of 1,000 watts at all times.

History
On November 18, 1975, the CRTC denied Radio Beauce an AM rebroadcaster at Lac-Etchemin for its Saint-Georges station, CKRB 1460; the rebroadcaster was to have operated on 920 kHz with 1,000 watts. Radio Beauce would receive approval in 1976 for a new AM station at Lac-Etchemin, this time at 1240 kHz with a daytime power of 1,000 watts and night-time power of 250 watts; as in the initial application, programming would originate with CKRB, with four hours of local programming daily for the Lac-Etchemin area. CIRB signed on the air on October 16, 1977.

On December 13, 1984, Radio Beauce received approval to increase CIRB's night power from 250 watts to 1,000 watts.

Closure
On May 14, 1991, Radio Beauce received approval for the revocation of the licence of CIRB, following accusations that the station was not meeting its music quotas, in which the station voluntarily decided to cease broadcasting and have its license revoked instead.

References

External links

IRB
IRB
Irb
Irb
Radio stations established in 1977
Radio stations disestablished in 1991

IRB
IRB (AM)